Walt Whitman Park is a park in the Downtown Brooklyn section of Brooklyn, New York City, commemorating Walt Whitman. It is adjacent to Cadman Plaza East to the west and Adams Street to the east.

References

External links

Downtown Brooklyn
Parks in Brooklyn